Mads Øris Nielsen (born March 17, 1981) is a Danish handballer playing in the Danish club Bjerringbro-Silkeborg Håndbold. He played his first national game November 28, 2008 and has per March 18, 2011 scored 53 goals in 27 games.

References 
 Player info at Danish Handball Federation 
 Player info at Bjerringbro Silkeborg 

Danish male handball players
1981 births
Living people
21st-century Danish people